The 1988 Skate Canada International was held in Thunder Bay, Ontario on October 29–31. Medals were awarded in the disciplines of men's singles, ladies' singles, pair skating, and ice dancing.

Results

Men

Ladies

Pairs

Ice dancing

References

Skate Canada International, 1988
Skate Canada International
1988 in Canadian sports 
1988 in Ontario